St. Augustine High School  is a Catholic Diocesan co-educational private high school located in Laredo, Texas, United States. Grades 9 through 12 are taught in a Christian environment. St. Augustine is the only Catholic high school in Laredo. Approximately 390 students attend the school.

History
St. Augustine was founded by the Oblates and the Sisters of Divine Providence in 1927. It was named in honor of Aurelius Augustinus (also known as Augustine of Hippo or Saint Augustine), one of the most important figures in the development of Western Christianity. The original St. Augustine campus was located in downtown in San Agustin Historical District in Laredo, Texas. During the mid-1970s the school was relocated. Through 1999 the school was under the control of the Roman Catholic Diocese of Corpus Christi. In 2000 the Roman Catholic Diocese of Laredo was established and the control of the school transferred to it. St. Augustine School is accredited by the Texas Catholic Conference Education Department.

Community
There are 300 students enrolled with a class size of approximately 100/class and a student/ teacher ratio of 22:1; The Class of 2011 included 98 seniors, half of whom graduated "DAP", as per the Distinguished Achievement Plan, the highest graduation plan, of the state of Texas. The grading scale is as follows - 90-100: A; 80-89: B; 70-79: C; 69- below: F (failing).

Curriculum
St. Augustine High School, a college preparatory institution, bases its curriculum on the State of Texas' Distinguished Achievement Plan (DAP) with the following courses:

English (4 credits)
Theology (4 credits)
Social Studies (4 credits including Geography, Economics, and Government)
Math (4 credits: Geometry, Algebra II, Pre-Calculus, and Calculus)
Science (4 credits: Biology, Chemistry, Physics, and AP)
Foreign Language (3 credits of Spanish)
Physical Education (1 credit)
Art (1 credit)
Speech (.5 credit)
SAT required electives (1.5 credits: SAT Prep Verbal and SAT Prep Math)
Electives (1 credit)

These courses collectively give every student at St. Augustine High School a total of 28 credits.
Advancement Placement courses offered include Biology, Calculus, Environmental Science, English and World History.

Dual credit opportunities

Juniors and seniors may be concurrently enrolled at Laredo Community College or Texas A&M International University for dual credits of 12-24 college hours. With the college credit measure, over 50% of the Class of 2012 was projected to graduate DAP.

In 2011, St. Augustine High School embarked upon the UT ChemBridge Program in which seniors took CHEM 304&305 online as dual credit courses for six hours of college credit through the University of Texas at Austin. However, the school discontinued this program as of the 2013-2014 academic year.
In 2012, the school partnered with Incarnate Word High School to offer Psychology online for dual credit.

Athletics
St. Augustine School offers the following sports programs.

Baseball
Basketball
Cross country
Golf
Tennis
Track and field
Volleyball

College admission
Traditionally, all St. Augustine graduates apply, are accepted, and attend college - whether in Texas, throughout the U.S, or internationally.  Of the Class of 2011, 72% of graduates planned to attend universities, 23% planned to attend colleges, and 5% planned to study in Mexico. Of the 72% attending universities, 15% were enrolled at Catholic universities, 15% at Texas A&M or UT; 10% at other universities in Texas, 5% out of state, and the remainder at A&M or UT System Schools.

Top destinations include:
Texas A&M International University
Texas A&M University
University of the Incarnate Word
University of Texas at San Antonio

Graduates have also attended:
New York University
Rice University
Trinity University
University of Notre Dame
University of Texas

Class rank and GPA are calculated numerically each semester based upon a traditional 100 point scale. The average GPA for the top 25% of the Class of 2011 was 95 and the class median was 90. The average SAT score of the top 10% of the graduates of May 2011 was 1150 (Math & Reading) and of the top 25%, 1100. Graduates receive scholarships based on need and merit, with the previous year's class receiving nearly $3 million in awards. One Class of 2011 student was named National Hispanic Scholar, while one earned the Gates Millennium Award.

Class of 2012 statistics
30% of the graduating senior class were active members in St. Augustine's National Honor Society. 50% of the senior class graduated with honors. 60% of the senior class graduated DAP (Distinguished Achievement). A total of 9,000 service hours were completed collectively by the graduating class of 2012 and an average of 18 college hours were completed. In the Class of 2012 two students were named National Hispanic Scholars and another student earned the Gates Millennium Award.

Notable alumni
 Alfonso Gomez-Rejon (Class of 1990) - Emmy-nominated film and television director; director of Me and Earl and the Dying Girl
 William Nericcio (Class of 1980) - Director of the Master of Arts in Liberal Arts and Sciences program at San Diego State University, San Diego and creator of #mextasy.
 Adrian Quesada (Class of 1995) - co-founder of Grammy Award-winning Latin funk orchestra Grupo Fantasma
 Saul N. Ramirez, Jr. (Class of 1976) - Mayor of Laredo 1990–1997; CEO of Washington interest group National Association of Housing and Redevelopment Officials

References

External links
 Saint Augustine High School

Catholic secondary schools in Texas
Educational institutions established in 1927
High schools in Laredo, Texas
1927 establishments in Texas